Captain George Ernest Shelley (15 May 1840 – 29 November 1910) was an English geologist and ornithologist. He was a nephew of the poet Percy Bysshe Shelley.

Shelley was educated at the Lycée de Versailles and served a few years in the Grenadier Guards.

His books included A Monograph of the Cinnyridae, or Family of Sun Birds (1878), A Handbook to the Birds of Egypt (1872) and The Birds of Africa (5 volumes, 1896–1912) illustrated by J. G. Keulemans.

References

External links

 
Illustrations appearing in Handbook to the Birds of Egypt

1840 births
1910 deaths
English geologists
English ornithologists
Grenadier Guards officers
Place of birth missing
Place of death missing